Robert DiMaio (born February 19, 1968) is a Canadian former professional ice hockey player. He played in 894 National Hockey League (NHL) games with the New York Islanders, Tampa Bay Lightning, Philadelphia Flyers, Boston Bruins, New York Rangers, Carolina Hurricanes, and Dallas Stars. He is currently the General Manager of the San Diego Gulls. He won the Stanley Cup with the Blues in 2019.

Playing career
DiMaio was first drafted by the New York Islanders 6th round, 118th overall in the 1987 NHL Entry Draft, and captained their minor league Springfield Indians affiliate to a Calder Cup championship in 1990; he was the final active NHL player of the Indians' franchise. Over the course of his career, he played for the Islanders, Boston Bruins, New York Rangers, Philadelphia Flyers, Carolina Hurricanes, Dallas Stars, and was one of the original Lightning players during Tampa's inaugural season. He suffered a severe concussion after a controversial hit by Montreal Canadiens forward Guillaume Latendresse during the 2006 preseason, which ended his career. He won the Italian championship in the 2005 with Hockey Club Milano Vipers.

Transactions
June 18, 1992- Claimed by the Tampa Bay Lightning from the New York Islanders in the Expansion Draft.
March 18, 1994- Traded by the Tampa Bay Lightning to the Philadelphia Flyers in exchange for Jim Cummins and Philadelphia's 1995 4th round draft choice.
September 30, 1996- Claimed on waivers by the San Jose Sharks from the Philadelphia Flyers.
September 30, 1996- Traded by the San Jose Sharks to the Boston Bruins in exchange for Boston's 1997 5th round draft choice.
March 10, 2000- Traded by the Boston Bruins to the New York Rangers in exchange for Mike Knuble.
August 4, 2000- Traded by the New York Rangers, along with Darren Langdon, to the Carolina Hurricanes in exchange for Sandy McCarthy and Carolina's 2001 4th round draft choice.
July 1, 2001- Signed as free agent with the Dallas Stars.
January 2005- Signed with Hockey Club Milano Vipers.
August 9, 2005- Signed as a free agent with the Tampa Bay Lightning.

Career statistics

References

External links
 

1968 births
Boston Bruins personnel
Boston Bruins players
Canadian ice hockey right wingers
Canadian people of Italian descent
Capital District Islanders players
Carolina Hurricanes players
Dallas Stars players
Dallas Stars scouts
HC Milano players
Kamloops Blazers players
Living people
Medicine Hat Tigers players
New York Islanders draft picks
New York Islanders players
New York Rangers players
Philadelphia Flyers players
St. Louis Blues scouts
SCL Tigers players
Ice hockey people from Calgary
Springfield Indians players
Tampa Bay Lightning players
Utah Grizzlies (AHL) players
Canadian expatriate ice hockey players in Italy
Canadian expatriate ice hockey players in Switzerland
Stanley Cup champions